Warwick Hospital on Lakin Road in the northwest of Warwick, Warwickshire, England is run by South Warwickshire NHS Foundation Trust.

History
The facility has its origins in the infirmary built for the Warwick Union Poorhouse in Union Road (now Lakin Road) in 1848. The infirmary was extended in 1857 and 1876 with a chapel and mortuary following in 1883. A new purpose-built hospital was completed in 1903 and the old workhouse, which became known as the Warwick Public Assistance Institution, was integrated into the new hospital after 1930. The hospital joined the National Health Service in 1948 and the Public Assistance Institution ceased to operate as a separate body from 1949.

The main maternity unit for the district was moved from Warneford Hospital in Leamington Spa to Warwick in 1993. A new cancer centre known as the Aylesford Unit opened in a dedicated building in February 2010. The hospital also started work on a new birthing centre in 2018.

Gallery

See also
 List of hospitals in England

References

External links

Hospitals in Warwickshire
Hospital buildings completed in 1903
Buildings and structures in Warwick
NHS hospitals in England